Tricholosporum pseudosordidum is a species of fungus in the family Tricholomataceae. It is known from Florida.

Taxonomy
The species was originally described as Tricholoma pseudosordidum by Rolf Singer in 1945, and William Murrill transferred it to Melanoleuca in 1949. Tim Baroni moved it to Tricholosporum in 1982.

References

External links

pseudosordidum
Fungi of North America
Fungi described in 1945
Taxa named by Rolf Singer